Duke of Rothesay is a dynastic title of the heir apparent to the British throne, currently William, Prince of Wales. William's wife Catherine, Princess of Wales, is the current Duchess of Rothesay. Duke of Rothesay was a title of the heir apparent to the throne of the Kingdom of Scotland before 1707, of the Kingdom of Great Britain from 1707 to 1800, and now of the United Kingdom of Great Britain and Northern Ireland. It is the title mandated for use by the heir apparent when in Scotland, in preference to the titles Duke of Cornwall (which also belongs to the eldest living son of the monarch, when and only when he is also heir apparent, by right) and Prince of Wales (traditionally granted to the heir apparent), which are used in the rest of the United Kingdom and overseas. The Duke of Rothesay also holds other Scottish titles, including those of Earl of Carrick, Baron of Renfrew, Lord of the Isles, and Prince and Great Steward of Scotland. The title is named after Rothesay on the Isle of Bute, but is not associated with any legal entity or landed property, unlike the Duchy of Cornwall.

History
David Stewart, Duke of Rothesay, the son of Robert III of Scotland, first held the dukedom from its creation in 1398. After his death, his brother James, later King James I, received the dukedom. Thereafter, the heir apparent to the Scottish Crown held the dukedom; an Act of the Parliament of Scotland passed in 1469 confirmed this pattern of succession.

The Earldom of Carrick existed as early as the 12th century. In 1306, Robert the Bruce, Earl of Carrick, became King Robert I of Scotland, with the earldom merging in the Crown. In the following years, successive Kings of Scotland created several heirs apparent Earl of Carrick. The Act of 1469 finally settled the earldom on the eldest son of the Scottish monarch.

The office of the Great Steward of Scotland (also called High Steward or Lord High Steward) dates back to its first holder, Walter fitz Alan, in the 12th century. The seventh Great Steward, Robert, ascended the Scottish throne as Robert II in 1371. Thereafter, only the heirs apparent to the Crown held the office. The 1469 Act also deals with this.

Between the 1603 union of the crowns and Edward VII's time as heir apparent, the style "Duke of Rothesay" appears to have dropped out of usage in favour of "Prince of Wales". Queen Victoria mandated the title for use to refer to the eldest son and heir apparent when in Scotland, and this usage has continued since. This may have been as a result, direct or indirect, of the 1822 visit of King George IV to Scotland.

Lord of the Isles

Another of the non-peerage titles belonging to the heir apparent, that of Lord of the Isles, merits special mention. The Lords of the Isles, of the MacDonald family, originally functioned as vassals of the Scottish, or Norwegian, kings who ruled the Western Isles. The ambitious John MacDonald II, fourth Lord of the Isles, made a secret treaty in 1462 with King Edward IV of England, by which he sought to make himself an independent ruler.

In 1475, James III discovered the Lord of the Isles' actions, and the Lordship became subject to forfeiture. MacDonald later regained his position, but James IV again deprived him of his titles in 1493 after his nephew provoked a rebellion. In 1540 James V of Scotland granted the Lordship to the heirs apparent to the Crown.

Legal basis
An Act of the Parliament of Scotland passed in 1469 governs the succession to most of these titles. It provides that "the first-born Prince of the King of Scots for ever" should hold the dukedom. If the firstborn Prince dies before the King, the title is not inherited by his heir – it is only for the firstborn son, like the Duchy of Cornwall — nor is either inherited by the deceased duke's next brother, unless that brother also becomes heir apparent. Though the Act specified "King", eldest sons of queens regnant subsequently also held the dukedom. The interpretation of the word Prince, however, does not include women. The eldest son of the British Sovereign, as Duke of Rothesay, had the right to vote in elections for representative peers from 1707. (The 1707 Acts of Union between the Parliament of Scotland and Parliament of England formally unified both kingdoms to create the Kingdom of Great Britain). This right continued until 1963, when the UK Parliament abolished the election of representative peers.

List of Dukes of Rothesay
Holders of the Dukedom of Rothesay, with the processes by which they became Dukes of Rothesay and by which they ceased to hold the title:

Family tree

Current holder

Since 2022 William, Prince of Wales, has held the title of Duke of Rothesay, and uses it when in Scotland. He has the formal Scottish style of HRH The Prince William, Duke of Rothesay.

The personal arms of the preceding Duke were bestowed upon him in 1974 by the Queen. The escutcheon features on the 1st and 4th quarters the arms of the Great Steward of Scotland, with the 2nd and 3rd quarters featuring the arms of the Lord of the Isles. The arms of the current Duke are distinguished from those of Clan Stewart of Appin through the addition of an inescutcheon displaying the arms of the heir apparent to the King of Scots, namely the Royal arms of Scotland with a three-point label. The full achievement of the current Duke's arms are a variation of the Royal coat of arms of Scotland used prior to the Union of the Crowns in 1603.

References 

 
Dukedoms in the Peerage of Scotland
Noble titles created in 1398
Heirs to the throne
Scottish monarchy
Succession to the British crown
Rothesay, Bute
British and Irish peerages which merged in the Crown
William, Prince of Wales